"All the Love in the World" is a song by Dionne Warwick, released as a single in 1982. It was written by The Bee Gees (Barry, Robin & Maurice Gibb), and was featured on Warwick's hit album Heartbreaker, produced by Barry Gibb, Karl Richardson, and Albhy Galuten. Barry Gibb provides backing vocals on the track. It was Warwick's third single from the album, behind "Heartbreaker" and "Take the Short Way Home". The song just missed the Billboard Hot 100 in the US (number 101), but charted at number 16 on the US Adult Contemporary Chart and at number 10 on the UK Singles Chart.

Chart performance

Weekly charts

Year-end charts

References

External links
Dionne Warwick – All the Love in the World at www.discogs.com
 

Dionne Warwick songs
Barry Gibb songs
Songs written by Barry Gibb
Songs written by Robin Gibb
Songs written by Maurice Gibb
1982 singles
1982 songs
Song recordings produced by Albhy Galuten
Arista Records singles